Podemos Castile and León is the Castilian-Leonese federation of the Spanish political party Podemos. The Secretary General is Pablo Fernández Santos.

Electoral performance

Cortes of Castile and León

References

Castile and León
Political parties in Castile and León